The Vesicular acetylcholine transporter (VAChT) is a neurotransmitter transporter which is responsible for loading acetylcholine (ACh) into secretory organelles in neurons making acetylcholine available for secretion. It is encoded by Solute carrier family 18, member 3 (SLC18A3) gene, located within the first intron of the choline acetyltransferase gene. VAChT is able to transport ACh into vesicles by relying on an exchange between protons (H+) that were previously pumped into the vesicle diffusing out, thus acting as an antiporter. ACh molecules are then carried into the vesicle by the action of exiting protons. Acetylcholine transport utilizes a proton gradient established by a vacuolar ATPase.

VAChT uptake inhibitors

Radiolabeled compounds 
PET imaging of the VAChT may provide insights into early diagnosis of Alzheimer's disease.

 (−)-trans-2-Hydroxy-3-(4-(4-[18F]fluorobenzoyl)piperidino)tetralin; racemate: Ki = 2.70 nM for VAChT, 191 nM for σ1, and 251 nM for σ2

References

Further reading

External links 
 

Solute carrier family